Triesenberg is a municipality in Liechtenstein with a population of 2,636. Its area of  makes it the largest municipality in Liechtenstein.

History
Triesenberg is noted for its distinct dialect, dating from the influence of Walser migrants in the Middle Ages, who arrived in the region early in the 14th century. This dialect is actively promoted by the municipality. The existence of this dialect is one evidence of remarkable linguistic diversity within the small Principality, as it is spoken alongside the Standard German and Alemannic dialect common to the country.

Geography
The municipality includes eight villages: Gaflei, Malbun, Masescha, Rotenboden, Silum, Steg, Sücka and Wangerberg. Malbun is the only ski-resort village in the country, located not far from the border with Austria (Vorarlberg).

Notable people 

 Gustav Schädler (1883 Triesenberg – 1961 in Vaduz), politician and a former Prime Minister of Liechtenstein
 Marco Schädler (born 1964 in Triesenberg) composer, he studied music at the conservatory in Feldkirch, Austria.

Gallery

References

External links

Official website

Municipalities of Liechtenstein